Edward Lloyd (16 February 1815 – 8 April 1890) was a British London-based publisher. His early output of serialised fiction brought Sweeney Todd, Varney the Vampire, and many romantic heroes to a new public – those without reading material that they could both afford to buy and enjoy reading. His hugely popular penny dreadful serials earned him the means to move into newspapers.

Moving away from fiction in the 1850s, his Sunday title, Lloyd’s Weekly, was the first newspaper to reach a million circulation. He later created the Daily Chronicle, renowned for the breadth of its news coverage. It grew in political influence until bought out in 1918 by Prime Minister David Lloyd George.

Lloyd's enthusiasm for industrial processes and technical innovation gave him an unbeatable competitive edge. In 1856, he set a new standard for Fleet Street’s efficiency by introducing Hoe’s rotary press. A few years later, when taking the unusual step of making his own newsprint, he revolutionised the paper trade by harvesting vast crops of esparto grass in Algeria. Lloyd was the only nineteenth century newspaper proprietor to take control of his entire supply chain, i.e. achieve full vertical integration.

Professor Rohan McWilliam of Anglia Ruskin University believes Lloyd to be a key figure who shaped popular culture, in terms of the press and popular fiction, stating “he was a key figure in the emergence of newspapers and popular culture in Britain.”

Early publishing 
Edward Lloyd was the third son of a family impoverished by the father's intermittent bankruptcy. He was born in Thornton Heath and spent his life in London. After leaving school at 14, he abandoned work in a law firm when he discovered a much more absorbing topic from his evening studies at the London Mechanics' Institute – printing.

This shaped his ambitions and fuelled a lifelong passion for invention and machinery. At the same time, his first-hand knowledge of how people lived in the overcrowded streets on the City's periphery inspired him to encourage poor people to read and so to improve their lot in life. Charging a penny for all his regular publications, his contribution to the spread of literacy is widely acknowledged.

Lloyd received a full school education at a time when most people had little or none beyond the basic reading skill that some learnt at Sunday school. With industrialisation gathering pace, there was a growing demand for literate workers, particularly clerks. He wanted to spread the advantages of full literacy, numeracy and general knowledge by making enjoyable reading material affordable. As women were to be among his prime targets, it also had to be decent and morally sound.

To begin with, he was able to support himself by selling cheap items such as cards and songs. In 1832, he started his first periodical, The Weekly Penny Comic Magazine. This may have led to his association with the cartoonist, Charles Jameson Grant, some of whose cartoons he published in the mid-1830s in a series called Lloyd’s Political Jokes. He set up presses of his own from 1835 in rented shop premises.

Popular fiction 
Lloyd's responsibilities grew in 1834 after he married and his first son was born. He wrote and printed a shorthand primer based on what he had learnt at the Institute, entering all the symbols by hand and selling it for 6d.

In search of a more stable source of income, he turned to serialised fiction. Some appeared as stand-alone instalments and some in periodicals. Over the years, he launched many of these under names such as People’s Periodical and Family Library, Lloyd’s Entertaining Journal and Lloyd’s Penny Weekly Miscellany of Romance and General Interest. Others focused on practical matters like gardening and household management or mixed such material with stories. Both stories and magazines continued for as long as demand for them lasted.

As a publisher, Lloyd lacked pretension. His output was free of snobbery, social or intellectual. He made no claim to originality and frequently used other people's good ideas. As long as the telling was original, plots could be taken from anywhere – a freedom still endorsed by copyright law. If a story was not to his readers’ liking, he told the author to finish it off in one episode and start another.

From the mid-1830s until the early 1850s, his prolific output eclipsed the competition. His first efforts were the rather bloodthirsty lives of pirates and highwaymen that earned the name “penny bloods” (later called “penny dreadfuls"). However, his speciality was “romances” – exciting tales of love and adventure. The String of Pearls, with Sweeney Todd as its anti-hero, and his vampire story, Varney, were in this category. He published about 200 romances whereas his closest competitor, George Pierce, published fewer than 50.

Many freelance authors contributed the material, at first paid by the line and later by the page. A pool of engravers supplied woodcuts for illustration. The authors he used most were James Malcolm Rymer (1814–84) and Thomas Peckett Prest (1810-59).

Plagiarism 
Lloyd made an early killing from plagiarising Charles Dickens, with works such as The Penny Pickwick, Oliver Twiss and Nickelas Nicklebery. An issue of his Pickwick reputedly sold 50,000 copies. It was unkind for Lloyd to brag that he sold more than the original: Dickens’s own work cost 12 times as much as Lloyd’s imitation. The plagiarised versions cost only a penny and were sold through tobacconists and small shops in order to reach market of semi-literate readers outside the range of middle-class booksellers.

Plagiarism was far from laudable, but it was commonplace at the time. The law was powerless to stop it and a lawsuit brought by Chapman & Hall, Dickens’s publishers, failed. Lloyd was sued for “fraudulent imitation” of The Pickwick Papers in 1837. The judge ruled that the publishers had not made out a viable case, without calling on Dickens to testify. Thanks to his tireless campaigning for reform, an Act in 1842 gave the author copyright and a right to stop infringement.

From fiction to Fleet Street 
It is often said that Lloyd grew ashamed of his early publishing activities and sent people around the country to buy up and burn all that they could lay hands on. As his grandchildren seem to have been unaware of his early career, knowledge of it may have been suppressed. In 1861, he held a remainders sale signalling a very public end of the business, but he may have been prevailed upon later to rewrite his own history by a family that had reached the heights of the Victorian bourgeoisie.

Lloyd's fortunes were volatile. He averted bankruptcy in 1838 yet, in 1841, he and his eldest brother Thomas paid cash when they joined the Worshipful Company of Spectacle Makers (opticians). They may have done this because Edward wanted to set up in business in the City and membership of a livery company was a necessary or useful aid to this end. In 1843, he moved his business from Shoreditch to 12 Salisbury Square EC4, Samuel Richardson’s old house. He also became a freemason in 1845 (the Royal York Lodge of Perseverance).

In the 1840s, Lloyd expanded his stock of serialised fiction. The UK economy became unstable just as this business was at its briskest and the Sunday newspaper was still getting established. In the four years 1847-50, deflation raised the value of money by more than 20%. Heavily indebted, Lloyd struggled, and again had to compromise with his creditors in 1848. Inflation drove the value of money down again within eight years but, by then, Lloyd had got his finances in order and never looked back. When he died in 1890, he was worth at least £100m in today’s money.

Newspaper publishing 
It is clear that Lloyd wanted to publish a newspaper from early on but stamp duty made it too expensive for his market. Not only was the publication of news subject to a 1d duty, but advertising also bore a tax of 1s 9d per ad and paper, a duty of 1½d per pound in weight.

One of the ways to avoid the duty on news was to publish a fictitious or historical story that echoed current news so that readers would learn the outcome of the actual event from the dénouement of the story. The title Lloyd’s Penny Sunday Times & People’s Police Gazette suggests that this contained such “news”, along with some out-and-out fiction.

Although the duty on news was the most invidious “tax on knowledge”, the heavy duty on paper had a malign effect on newspaper economics. The Fourdrinier process produced paper on a continuous reel. The efficiency of "web printing" that this promised was thwarted by the Stamp Office's insistence on stamping the paper in sheet form. Although this was good for print-room workers, the advantages for Fleet Street were delayed by 50 years.

Lloyd’s Weekly Newspaper 

The launch of the Sunday paper that eventually became Lloyd’s Weekly was blighted by two of Lloyd's bad habits. First, he copied the title and format of the hugely successful Illustrated London News that had been launched in May 1842. Second, he succumbed to the urge to avoid stamp duty.

Lloyd’s Penny Illustrated Newspaper first became Lloyd's Illustrated London Newspaper when the Stamp Office promised to fine Lloyd for failing to pay stamp duty. This version fared no better: quality engravings proved to be too costly, so Lloyd abandoned them and renamed the paper Lloyd’s Weekly London Newspaper. He had to raise the price to 3d later in 1843, increasing the word count to compensate.

The paper's editorials took a fiercely radical line to begin with. Since Lloyd controlled the contents himself, this probably reflected his views, but there is no direct evidence of his political sympathies. It was equally important for him to follow the radical line because his intended readers would have had no truck with the politics of Whig or Tory.

Lloyd did most of the tasks now associated with an editor himself, keeping it on a tight leash all his life. The paper consisted largely of objective news reporting. The idea propagated by historians of the Victorian press that Lloyd’s Weekly specialised in crime, scandal and sensation could not be more misleading. Sure, it carried police and court news but it was written with prosaic decency and had nothing in common with today's colourful tabloids. Lloyd wanted the man of the house to be able to take it home and have the confidence to leave it for his wife and even his children to read.

Lloyd appointed a journalist of high literary standing, Douglas Jerrold, in 1852. The salary (£1,000 a year) was extravagant for one leading article a week, indicating Lloyd's determination to recruit a star editor. Jerrold was liberal, but with a small “L” rather than as a Liberal Party follower. The two men got on well and it is believed that Jerrold had considerable influence, particularly in reining in Lloyd's wilder tendencies.

After Douglas died in 1857, his son Blanchard took over and continued until his death in 1885. The role then passed to Lloyd's trusted long-time employee, Thomas Catling. Having started in the print room, Catling became a reporter in the classic news-hound mould and later sub-editor.

He proved to be a loyal friend and indispensable assistant to Lloyd. He was a keen supporter of William Gladstone and Lloyd’s Weekly supported the Liberal Party when he was editor. Robert Donald, who also edited the Daily Chronicle, became editor in 1906.

Circulation of Lloyd’s Weekly reached 32,000 in its first year, but it was slow to grow. Things looked up in 1852 thanks to Jerrold's appointment and some sought-after coverage, such as the Duke of Wellington's death and funeral. It hit the 100,000 mark in 1855 when the stamp duty on news was abolished and the price went down to 2d.

The clincher came in 1861 when paper duty was abolished. Lloyd reduced the price to 1d and the growth in circulation took off. By 1865, it was selling more than 400,000 copies. It became so popular that the music hall artiste, Matilda Wood, chose Marie Lloyd as her stage name “because everyone’s heard of Lloyd’s”. Circulation continued to rise steadily and passed the million mark on 16 February 1896. During the war, it rose to 1,500,000.

Lloyd’s Weekly passed to Lloyd George's company in 1918 along with the Daily Chronicle. It declined in the 1920s. An attempt by the prolific popular writer, Edgar Wallace, to keep it going independently after the financial crash in 1929 failed. In 1931, the Sunday News, as it was by then, was subsumed into the Sunday Graphic.

Lloyd cherished this newspaper as his first-born. In 1889 he undertook a major overhaul – the format had not changed much in 45 years. This was so taxing that he fell ill that summer, probably from a heart attack. After recovering, he returned to the task and it was all but finished when he died on 8 April 1890.

The Daily Chronicle 

In his early 60s, Lloyd was running a hugely successful Sunday paper using the most efficient technology available. He decided to launch a daily newspaper, no doubt partly to justify a state-of-the-art printing operation that was only needed once a week. A daily was surely necessary too to establish a serious Fleet Street presence.

He bought a local London paper in 1876 and remodelled it as a national newspaper in 1877. What had once been the Clerkenwell News was highly profitable due to its extensive advertising – a matter of great interest to Lloyd. He paid £30,000 for it, then spent a further £150,000 on developing it (about £19m in modern money).

Aimed at the middle market, the paper was valued for its news coverage: "Its strength seems to lie outside politics, for it is read, not for what it says about Liberal or Conservative, nor for the sensationalism which is the mainstay of some other papers, but chiefly for its accurate representation of what is going on around us."

Lloyd was keen to introduce books to readers who would not otherwise consider reading them. The editor during his lifetime was a literary Irish journalist, Robert Whelan Boyle. He died in February 1890, two months before Lloyd. He and the editors who followed were all enthusiastic for the paper's literary preference, and it carried many book reviews and essays. To the objection that the target market did not “belong to the book-buying classes”, they said: “Why should [books]
not be brought within the knowledge of the man in the street?”

In 1904, Robert Donald was appointed the Chronicle’s editor. He was a capable newspaperman, fiercely independent and scrupulous in his adherence to principle. This proved to be his and the Lloyd empire's downfall in 1918.

In April 1918, Lloyd George, by then prime minister, assured the House of Commons that the British army had not been reduced numerically before meeting the German onslaught in March. This was questioned by Sir Frederick Maurice, the general responsible for military management on the Western Front.

The Chronicle reported the Maurice Debate in the House of Commons factually, but Donald then employed Maurice as the paper's military correspondent. Enraged, Lloyd George persuaded Sir Henry Dalziel, already a newspaper owner, to take over the Chronicle. Money was raised from friends in the party and by selling peerages.

After keen negotiation with Frank Lloyd, Edward Lloyd's son, the Chronicle was sold for £1.6m. The Lloyd valuation of the business (Chronicle, Lloyd’s Weekly plus book and magazine publishing) was £1.1m. To be paid nearly half as much again was an offer too good for Lloyd's heirs to refuse. Donald and Maurice had been kept in the dark until the day before the takeover took effect, raising some doubts about Frank Lloyd's loyalty to his employees.

The descent of one of the few truly independent newspapers into political ownership was deplored at the time and has some shock value to this day.

Industrial innovation 
Edward Lloyd's enthusiastic embrace of new technology did much to drive the efficiency of newspaper production forward for half a century. He also understood the importance of advertising in the Fleet Street economy and devised several ingenious promotional schemes.

From useful gadgets, like speaking tubes between rooms in his offices, to vast costly machines producing thousands of papers and miles of newsprint every day, Lloyd made it his business to research and understand anything of potential interest. His two epoch-changing  innovations were use of Hoe's rotary printing presses and the harvesting of esparto grass for paper-making.

Printing 
When Lloyd’s Weekly’s circulation was soaring in the 1850s, greater speed was urgently needed. Lloyd heard of the rotary press developed by Richard Hoe in New York that would multiply the speed of his existing presses. He went to Paris immediately to inspect the only specimen in Europe. He ordered one to be delivered to London without delay, and then a second.

Hoe conquered his reluctance to sell both at half price – a risk that was amply rewarded by the 12 orders from other London papers that soon followed. This was a happy decision for Lloyd. He had planned a trip to New York to persuade Hoe of the advantages of his having two machines at low cost. The ship that he was booked on, the Arctic, sank with the loss of 315 lives.

Demand in the UK was such that Hoe set up a factory near Fleet Street in the 1870s. By 1888, London newspapers were using 29 Hoe presses, a number matched by the French Marinoni presses that offered similar performance. The remaining 35 came from several different suppliers.

Hoe and Lloyd formed a collaboration that lasted a lifetime (Hoe died four years before Lloyd). Hoe constantly made improvements, e.g. by amending his original rotary press specification 175 times before it was superseded. Lloyd's exact requirements were invaluable in guiding Hoe's work, and Lloyd tested new features. He upgraded his presses as Hoe developed anything useful. His last purchase in 1887 was of eight presses each capable of printing 24,000 newspapers an hour.

Paper-making 
Also in the 1850s, supply problems prompted Lloyd to set up paper-making capacity of his own. Cotton rags, cotton waste and straw could no longer meet demand. He researched the alternatives.

Esparto grass, a tough desert grass previously sourced from Spain for making quality paper, looked promising. Lloyd set off for Algeria where he agreed to lease the rights to harvest esparto on 100,000 acres. At his processing centres in Oran and Arzew, he installed hydraulic machinery that compacted the grass into tight bales so that transport of the bulky but lightweight product was cost-effective. He chartered his own shipping.

Lloyd was able to start producing newsprint in 1861 on a site at Bow Bridge in East London. He soon became self-sufficient and then sold the surplus to other newspapers. In 1863 he bought an old paper mill at Sittingbourne in Kent. For 13 years, it was used to pulp the esparto and straw for the Bow operation. A huge experimental machine, 123 inches wide and built to Lloyd's specification despite the manufacturer's doubts about its practicality, was installed in 1876. It worked brilliantly and the whole operation was moved to Sittingbourne in 1877 where an even bigger American machine was then installed.

Softwood was set to overtake esparto during Lloyd's lifetime, but he was only importing it at the time of his death. His son Frank, who took over management of the paper mill, set up pulping plants with log-floating rights in Norway at Hønefoss and Hvittingfoss. The Sittingbourne plant grew to be the biggest in the world and Frank opened a new paper mill at neighbouring Kemsley in the 1920s. The business was sold shortly after his death in 1927 to Allied Newspapers (the Berry Brothers who became Lords Camrose, Kemsley and Iliffe). They sold it to Bowater in 1936, who sold it to Metsä-Serla in 1998, who closed it down in 2007.

Advertising 
Lloyd's most adventurous promotional wheeze was to stamp copper coins with the words “Lloyd’s Weekly Newspaper 3d Post Free”. He bought a machine that could stamp 250 an hour. A letter to The Times complained about defacement of the coin of the realm and Parliament passed an Act in 1853 making the stamping of coins a crime. Lloyd was not unduly put out because the whole affair had given massive publicity to his newspaper. He also continued using coins for advertising by glueing paper discs to them. Another ploy was to send men out during the night to paint advertisements for Lloyd’s Weekly on London's pavements.

In promotion of his own publications, Lloyd introduced the pictorial poster. It has been said that he spent a lot of time haring around the country looking for places to put up hoardings. While he would no doubt have looked for suitable sites while travelling, the idea that he would have taken time off from his superhuman workload in London to do something that could so easily be delegated is not believable.

He had 25 teams of poster stickers equipped with advertisements of various shapes and sizes who travelled far and wide. Hatton reported that he spent as much as £300 a week (£32,500 now) on "billing and posting". Catling reported that Lloyd made frequent visits to barbers’ shops to sound out local sales opportunities and to hear the gossip – a resource for which barbers’ shops were famous.

Newspapers’ revenue from advertising developed alongside Lloyd's career. Until abolished in 1853, the duty was prohibitive. Since a new habit had to be established, it took the market a while to get going. Lloyd’s Weekly carried half a page in 1855 and all the ads were commercial. By 1865, the volume had risen to two pages and half were personal small ads. By 1875, advertising of both types took up more than three pages.

At the Daily Chronicle, advertising yielded as much as 40% of revenues and volume had to be limited to no more than half the newspaper. Following the local newspaper tradition, it carried quantities of small ads.

Personal life 

Lloyd's family background was middle class, if indigent. His parents imbued their three sons with sound values. The middle class aspirations that went with them were a mixed blessing, though. Edward's eldest brother Thomas became a doctor and Fellow of the Royal College of Surgeons, and Edward clearly did well, but sadly his middle brother William never made it and died from alcoholism.

Lloyd's marriage to Isabella McArthur in 1834 was followed by the birth of Edward Jr in the same year and Charles in 1840. They both lived into old age. A third son Alfred was born in 1842 but lived only 17 months. From April 1844, although still married to Isabella, Edward had set up house with Mary Harvey in Forest Hill.  She was the wife of Lloyd's paper supplier William Mullett and the liaison led to Mullett suing Lloyd for "Criminal Conversation" in December 1844. William Mullet had discovered the affair and his revelations to Isabella caused her to move out of the Salisbury Square house.

Mary and Edward had a child, Frederick, born in February 1845. Mary died of cholera in August 1849 and Frederick was brought up by his father and he participated fully in the business and was one of the four children who received a larger than average share under his will. He provided for Edward Jr and Charles, although they also spent time with their mother's family.

He then formed the relationship with Maria Martins that was to last for the rest of his life. It is not known when they met, except that they were present in the same house at the time of the 1851 census. As Isabella was still alive, they could not marry. They did so, quietly in Essex, three weeks after Isabella's death in 1867. Eleven of their 15 children had already been born.

The Victorian world would have taken an increasingly dim view of Lloyd's record and might have condemned him for not taking to a life of celibacy on separation from Isabella. This would not have been expected of ordinary people in the 1840s but, by the 1870s, the overriding importance of social standing would have made it imperative to hide the illegitimacy of 12 of his children and desirable to draw a veil over his modest origins and racy early career.

If it was indeed the family who suppressed the truth, they did him a great disservice. By the mid-twentieth century, all his achievements had been forgotten, while the illegitimacy and his early publishing were easily traced. To these were added speculative aspersions, such as his greed and meanness in business, licentious behaviour that resulted in many more children whom he abandoned, and the vulgarity of all his publications, from the penny bloods to Lloyd’s Weekly.

All this went completely contrary to the views of people who knew him. He was greatly respected for his incisive intelligence, untiring energy and many talents: “Personally, he was a very interesting man, his talk – shrewd, penetrating and pertinent – being a reflection of his character” (the London correspondent of the South Australian Chronicle, 1890). Only records of his relationships with people whom he met in the course of business survive, but his ability to have warm lasting friendships with several of them (e.g. Douglas Jerrold, Richard Hoe, Tom Catling) suggests a man of considerable humanity and good humour.

Although Frank, Lloyd's eldest son by Maria, outshone his father in terms of pure philanthropy, the evidence suggests that Lloyd was also a good employer. Writing about his Bow Bridge paper mill and printing works in 1875, William Glenny Crory described an orderly well-run operation employing 200 apparently contented staff. In 1862-63, Lloyd's Weekly raised £3,676 (£410,000 now) for the victims of the cotton famine in Lancashire partly from the proceeds of above-average sales of the paper in December 1862. Worker participation was introduced at the paper mills in Kent during Edward's lifetime. Frank took this much further and built a model village for the paper workers in the 1920s. Lloyd Park in Croydon, UK is formed of land bequeathed by Frank Lloyd and is named after him.

All Edward's children were well educated, mostly at small boarding schools – a practice that was near-universal at the time for those who could afford it. Frank was partly educated in France. Others of his sons were probably educated abroad for at least part of their schooling.

Lloyd considered that it was important for his sons to be brought up with a view to entering business. Five of them worked for him in various capacities, with Frank shouldering most responsibility on his father's death.

The only child who went to university was his youngest son, Percy, who studied at Oxford and became a clergyman. Percy's lasting memorial is Voewood House in Norfolk. He commissioned the architect Edward S Prior to build it in 1902.

One feature of Lloyd's life and character that seems remarkable to the modern eye, though normal enough for people of his generation, was his assumption of financial responsibility for his business. Had it failed, his personal fortune would have gone with it. He set up a company in 1843, before limited liability was legally available, but it does not seem to have been used for outside investors. He probably used it as an accounting convenience while bearing full responsibility for its debts.

In 1890, he reconstituted Edward Lloyd Ltd as a limited liability company. Slightly more than half the shares were to be held in trust for his grandchildren. He kept the remaining shares himself and left these by a will, drawn up at the same time, that tied up his own property in trust for his children for 21 years. Probate on the will valued his estate at £565,000. Although the value of the shares in the family trust is speculative, it would probably have added £350,000 or so, making him worth roughly £105m in today's money on 8 April 1890, when he died.

He is buried on the western side of Highgate Cemetery.

References 

19th-century British newspaper publishers (people)
Publishers (people) from London
People from Thornton Heath
1815 births
1890 deaths
19th-century English businesspeople
Burials at Highgate Cemetery